The Women's Super League (formerly known as the Women's Premier League) is the top tier women's basketball league in Ireland. The league has 10 teams, all in the Republic of Ireland, and is an active member of Basketball Ireland, which is recognized by FIBA (also known as the International Basketball Federation) as the national governing body for basketball in Ireland.

History
The league was founded in 1978.

Teams

Roll of Honour

See also
Super League, the men's competition
Basketball Ireland

References

External links
Basketball Ireland news

 
Basketball competitions in Ireland
Women's basketball leagues in Europe
Women's sports leagues in Ireland
1978 establishments in Ireland
Women's basketball in Ireland
Professional sports leagues in Ireland